Lauren Yee is an American playwright.

Early life and education
Yee was born and raised in San Francisco, California. She graduated from Lowell High School in 2003.

Yee graduated from Yale University in 2007, majoring in English and Theatre Arts. She then attended University of California, San Diego's MFA playwriting program.

Among Yee's biggest influences are her great-grandparents who migrated to America from China during the era when the Chinese Exclusion Act was in effect.  To circumnavigate this they would migrate through Mexico across the Southern border to America and up to  San Francisco.  In addition, her father, Larry, inspired her to write two plays, these being "The Great Leap," and "King of the Yees." Both of these plays draw directly from her Chinese American History.

Career
Yee is a member of the Ma-Yi Writers’ Lab  and a Playwrights’ Center Core Writer and has worked under commission from the Goodman Theatre, Lincoln Center, and Mixed Blood.

In awarding the Whiting Award for 2019, the Selection Committee noted: "Her dialogue feels like overheard speech; even on the page, it asserts its vibrant, specific life...These plays feel ambitious and even monumental. They are also raucously funny, without ever losing sight of nuanced human experience."

Personal life
Yee married Zachary Zwillinger, an attorney, in September 2012 in San Francisco; the couple met at Yale.

Plays 
Ching Chong Chinaman  (Berkeley Impact Theatre)
Crevice (Impact Theatre)
The Tiger Among Us (January - February 2013, Mu Performing Arts (Minneapolis) 
The Hatmakers Wife (developed at PlayPenn New Play Conference in 2011; August 27, 2013 - September 21, 2013, Off-Broadway Playwrights Horizons)
Samsara (February 2015 - March 8, Chicago)
in a word (April 2015, San Francisco Playhouse)
Hookman (May 2015, Encore Theatre Company, San Francisco)
King of the Yees (2015, The Goodman Theatre's New Stages Festival)
 The Great Leap (2018, Off-Broadway)
 Cambodian Rock Band (2018, South Coast Repertory)
 The Song of Summer (2019, Trinity Repertory Company)
 Young Americans (2023, Portland Center Stage/Pittsburgh Public Theater)

Awards and honors
(in reverse chronological order)

2019
Doris Duke Performing Artist Award
Steinberg Playwright Award, with a cash award of $50,000.
Harold and Mimi Steinberg/American Theatre Critics Association New Play Award for Cambodian Rock Band, which includes a $25,000 prize.
Whiting Award in Drama
Signature Theatre Company (New York City) Residency 5 program. The program "guarantees playwrights three premieres over five years."

2018
Horton Foote Prize for Outstanding New American Play for Cambodian Rock Band.
Susan Smith Blackburn Prize finalist for The Great Leap
Princeton University MacKall Gwinn Hodder Fellows for the 2018–2019 academic year.

2017
 Joseph Kesselring Prize for The Great Leap.

2016
 Will Glickman Playwright Award winner (for in a word)
 Ashland New Play Festival – Women's Invitational winner (for King of the Yees)
 Francesca Primus Prize from the American Theatre Critics Association

2015 
 The Kilroys List Top 50 (for King of the Yees and The Tiger Among Us)
 Susan Smith Blackburn nominee (for in a word)
 The Chance Theatre playwright-in-residence
 Theatre Bay Area Award nominee – Outstanding World Premiere Play (for Hookman)

2014
 Lark Playwrights’ Week playwright (for The Tiger Among Us)
 Constance Saltonstall Foundation residency Berkeley Rep Ground Floor finalist (for King of the Yees)
 Leah Ryan Prize for Emerging Women Playwrights runner-up (for The Tiger Among Us)

2013
 O’Neill Conference playwright (for Samsara)
 Sundance Theatre Lab finalist (for in a word) Playwrights’ Center Core Writer (2013-2016)
 Virginia B. Toulmin Foundation grant (with the Goodman Theatre, for King of the Yees)
 Playwrights Realm Page One resident playwright
 Second Stage Theatre – Shank playwright-in-residence
 UCross Foundation residency
 L. Arnold Weissberger Award nominee (for Samsara)
 Gerbode Foundation Playwright Commissioning Award (with Encore Theatre Company)

2012
 Susan Smith Blackburn Prize nominee (for Samsara)
 Bay Area Playwrights Festival winner (for Samsara)
 Ma-Yi Writers Lab playwright (2012–present) PEN USA Literary Award for Drama finalist (for A Man, his Wife, and his Hat)
 Time Warner fellow at the Women's Project Playwrights Lab
 Bay Area Theatre Critics Circle nominee (for Crevice)
 Kitchen Dog Theatre's New Works Festival winner (for A Man, his Wife, and his Hat)
 East West Players’ Face of the Future Playwriting Competition third place (for Samsara)
 Aurora Theatre Global Age Project finalist (for in a word)

2011
 PlayPenn Conference playwright (for A Man, his Wife, and his Hat)
 KCACTF's Paul Stephen Lim Playwriting Award winner (for in a word)
 KCACTF's Jean Kennedy Smith Playwriting Award winner (for in a word)
 IICAS Student Research Travel Grant recipient (for Mu Performing Arts commission)

2010
 MAP Fund grantee (with Mu Performing Arts)
 Hangar Theater Lab Company playwright-in-residence (for in a word)
 Kennedy Center American College Theater Festival Paula Vogel Award in Playwriting (for Ching Chong Chinaman)
 El Gouna Writers’ Residency fellow

2009
 MacDowell Colony fellow
 Public Theater Emerging Writers Group member
 Theatre Bay Area New Works Fund commission (with AlterTheater)
 Wasserstein Prize finalist PONY Fellowship finalist
 Jerome Fellowship finalist (selected)
 American Antiquarian Society – Robert and Charlotte Baron fellow
 Hawthornden Castle International Retreat for Writers fellow
 2008 Princess Grace Award finalist (for Ching Chong Chinaman)
 Ludwig Vogelstein Foundation grantee Dramatists Guild fellow New York Mills Arts Retreat writer-in-residence
 Edward F. Albee Foundation fellow PlayGround June Anne Baker Prize winner/commission (for Crevice)

2007
 Kumu Kahua Theatre Pacific Rim Prize winner (for Ching Chong Chinaman)

References

External links

Year of birth missing (living people)
Living people
21st-century American dramatists and playwrights
Writers from San Francisco
Yale College alumni
University of California, San Diego alumni
American dramatists and playwrights of Chinese descent
American women dramatists and playwrights
21st-century American women writers